NPFL is the name of:

 National Patriotic Front of Liberia, a rebel group in the First Liberian Civil War
 National Pro Fastpitch League, professional women's softball league in the US
 Nigerian Professional Football League, the highest level of the Nigerian football league system
 North Pilbara Football League, an Australian rules football competition in Western Australia